Palmers Garden Centre or Palmers is a chain of New Zealand garden centres. It has 12 stores, including three in Auckland, selling a range of plants and gardening equipment.

The head office of Palmers is in Rosedale, Auckland.

History

Starting from humble beginnings Palmers was originally a family business. The original site, in Glen Eden, Auckland, was bought by A W Palmer for a plant nursery in 1912. The new business prospered and grew with New Zealand's first modern style garden centre being built on the Glen Eden site in 1958.

There were 20 Palmers stores in 2000, including eight in Auckland.

References

External links
Palmers Garden Centre Official website
Palmers Planet Official website

Home improvement companies of New Zealand
Garden centres
Retail companies established in 1912